Yutian Wanfang Airport  is an airport serving the city in Yutian County, Hotan Prefecture, Xinjiang, China.

It is designed to serve 180,000 passengers and 400 tons of cargo annually. The airport was opened on 26 December 2020, and became the 22nd airport in Xinjiang.

Airlines and destinations

See also
List of airports in China
List of the busiest airports in China

References

Airports in Xinjiang
Airports established in 2020
2020 establishments in China